GRIP and coiled-coil domain-containing protein 1 is a protein that in humans is encoded by the GCC1 gene.

Function 

The protein encoded by this gene is a peripheral membrane protein. It is sensitive to brefeldin A. This encoded protein contains a GRIP domain which is thought to be used in targeting. It may play a role in the organization of trans-Golgi network subcompartment involved with membrane transport.

Interactions 

GCC1 has been shown to interact with TRIM29.

References

Further reading